Tiger Arena is a 5,000-seat multi-purpose arena in Savannah, Georgia, United States. It is home to the Savannah State University Tigers men's and women's basketball teams and women's volleyball team. Tiger Arena has previously hosted the Georgia High School Association boys and girls playoffs (first round), the annual Georgia Athletic Coaches Association's North-South All-Star Game (2003-2008), and the Savannah Holiday Classic high school girls basketball tournament. It was also home to the Savannah Steam of American Indoor Football.

Construction
The facility was opened in 2000 and cost $9.6 million to build.  It replaced Willcox-Wiley Gymnasium, an athletic complex built in 1936.

See also
 List of NCAA Division I basketball arenas

References

Savannah State Tigers and Lady Tigers basketball
College basketball venues in the United States
College volleyball venues in the United States
Sports venues in Georgia (U.S. state)
Indoor arenas in Georgia (U.S. state)
2000 establishments in Georgia (U.S. state)
Sports venues completed in 2000